Anica Kovač (born 3 March 1976) is a Croatian former model best known for being the First Runner-up in the Miss World 1995 competition and for her marriage to the Croatian football player Robert Kovač.

Kovač was born to Croatian gastarbeiter parents from the village Borčani in Duvno, Bosnia and Herzegovina. She began modelling at an early age and became the winner of the national beauty contest Miss Croatia in 1995. At the 1995 Miss World competition, she finished as the First Runner-up to the eventual winner, Jacqueline Aguilera of Venezuela. She also won the Best National Costume award at the same event.

She has been married to Robert Kovač since 2001 and they have three children together.

External links
 Miss World 1995 delegates (Archived 2009-10-25)

1976 births
Living people
Croatian female models
Miss World 1995 delegates
Association footballers' wives and girlfriends
Croatian expatriates in Germany
German people of Bosnia and Herzegovina descent 
German people of Croatian descent